Stock Car Pro Series, formerly known as Stock Car Brasil, is a touring car auto racing series based in Brazil organized by Vicar. It is considered the major Brazilian and South American motorsports series. Starting in 1979 with Chevrolet as the only constructor, the series has also seen other constructors joining in and leaving such as Mitsubishi, Peugeot and Volkswagen, currently the only other besides Chevrolet is Toyota. The series is composed of 12 rounds, with the most important race, the Corrida do Milhão (English: The Million Race) being worth double points and has a prize pool of R$1 million. The competition has seen many internationally famous drivers in its ranks, such as Rubens Barrichello, Felipe Massa, Jacques Villeneuve, Lucas di Grassi, Nelson Piquet Jr., Ricardo Zonta, Tony Kanaan and António Félix da Costa.

There's also the Stock Series, formerly known as Stock Car Light, serving as the access category to the Pro Series.

History

1970s
The series was created in 1979 as an alternative to the former Division 1 championship that competed with Chevrolet Opala and Ford Maverick. The dominance of Chevrolet over Ford models was causing a lack of public interest and sponsors. General Motors then created a new category, with a name reminiscent of the famous NASCAR with standardized performance and components for all competitors. The first race was run on 22 April 1979 at the Autódromo Internacional de Tarumã, Rio Grande do Sul with 19 cars competing, all of them being 6-cylinder Chevrolet Opalas. The pole position was held by José Carlos Palhares, and the race was won by Affonso Giaffone.

1980s

This decade saw the emergence of several rivalries between drivers. In 1982 two races were held for the first time at the Autodromo do Estoril, Portugal.

The first major change in the Stock Car standard occurred in 1987. With the support of General Motors, a fairing designed and built by coachbuilder Caio was adopted, which was adapted to the Opala's chassis. The car exhibited improved aerodynamics and performance. Safety equipment become more sophisticated.

1990s

In 1990 General Motors renewed its interest in the category and built a prototype intended to replace the Caio/Hidroplas model.

In 1991 new rules were established and the races were disputed in double rounds on the weekends, with two drivers per car, but the series continued to lose ground with the public, sponsors and television networks to other championships with many manufacturers involved, such as Campeonato Brasileiro de Marcas e Pilotos that included the involvement of Chevrolet, Fiat, Ford and Volkswagen, as well as the always popular Formula racing championships.

In 1994 the championship returned to the old rules and Chevrolet announced that the Chevrolet Omega would be introduced as the new standard model. As part of a marketing strategy and in order to reduce costs, the tickets were free and the races were now held in double rounds sponsored by Brazilian Formula Chevrolet in an event called Chevrolet Challenger. This decade marked a dominant era for Ingo Hoffmann with eight titles, three in partnership with Ângelo Giombell. His only serious challenges came from Paulo Gomes in 1995 and Chico Serra in 1999.

2000s

From 2000 on, General Motors departed the series' management and Vicar Promoções Desportivas, owned by former racing driver Carlos Col, took over the organization. This ushered in a period of modernization and improved security as the category started to use a tubular chassis designated JL G-09. The project engineer was Edgardo Fernandez, who did something similar for the Argentina category Top Race V6, inspired by both NASCAR and the DTM. The chassis was built by Zeca Giaffone's JL Racing.

In 2003 the category replaced the Chevrolet 6-cylinder engine used with modifications since 1979 with a Chevrolet V8 imported from the United States by JL Racing, similar to the engines used by the NASCAR Busch Series. Despite not managing the series anymore, General Motors still participated in the series with the Vectra.

In 2005 Mitsubishi entered the series with the Mitsubishi Lancer, marking the first time in the series' history in which Chevrolet was not the sole manufacturer competing. 30 October of that same year marked the first race held in Argentina at Autódromo Juan y Oscar Gálvez, alongside the TC 2000 category. Attendance was 70,000. Giuliano Losacco was the winner, with Mateus Greipel second and Luciano Burti coming in third.

In 2006, Volkswagen entered in the series with the Bora and the championship adopted a point system similar to the one used in NASCAR, as well as a new system with 16 teams and 32 drivers. At the end of the season, the 10 best drivers were automatically qualified to run the 4 final races, called Super Final, similar to the Chase for the Sprint Cup. 

The 2007 season marked the largest amount of manufacturers competing in the category, with the entrance of Peugeot and the 307 Sedan. The season had the presence of Chevrolet, Mitsubishi, Peugeot, and Volkswagen. Volkswagen announced it was withdrawing from the category in 2008, with two-time champion Mitsubishi doing the same one year later in 2009. In 2008, the championship changed from Pirelli tires to Goodyear.

2010s
In 2010 the category started using ethanol as fuel and engines with electronic injection.

In 2011, Peugeot re-entered the championship announced with the 408 sedan model, replacing the 307. In 2012, Chevrolet introduced the Chevrolet Sonic as its competing model, replacing the Vectra. 2012 was also the last season in which Goodyear supplied tires, with Pirelli returning as the sole tire supplier in the championship from 2013 onward. The category announced changes in the championship for the 2012 season, dropping the Super Final system. The scoring system was also changed, with the top twenty drivers in each race being awarded points.

For the 2016 season, General Motors announced the Chevrolet Cruze as the replacement for the Sonic. In 2017, Peugeot announced its withdrawal from the championship, leaving Chevrolet as the sole automaker to compete in the series, making it a one-make championship, with all drivers using Cruze models.

2020s 
In 2020, Toyota Gazoo Racing entered alongside Chevrolet, fielding a regulation version of their Toyota Corolla, which received a facelift in 2021. The season also saw a return to a monocoque chassis, replacing the tubular chassis used since 2000. On 12 December 2022, Vicar and Pirelli announced that they would not be renewing their contract and that from 2023 onward, Stock Car, Stock Series, and the F4 Brazil Championship will be supplied exclusively by Hankook.

Support races
Created in 1992, the Brazilian Formula Chevrolet was the Series' main support category. It used the same chassis as Formula Opel until 1994, subsequently switching to a Techspeed chassis until 2002, which was the same year the category was retired.

The Stock Car Light second tier was created in 1993, and reformulated in 2008 to become the Copa Vicar. After a merger with Pick-up Racing Brasil, the Copa Chevrolet Montana was established and standardized around the Chevrolet Montana model. Pick-up Racing Brasil was a category created in 2001 but only became part of the Stock Car Brasil programme until 2006.

The Stock Car Jr. third tier was created in 2006. It was intended for young and amateur drivers moving from Kart racing. In 2010 the category was replaced with the Mini Challenge Brasil. After three seasons it was cancelled.

Manufacturer representation

Scoring systems

Speed records

Drivers

Notable drivers

 Affonso Giaffone Jr. (1979–1980s) – The winner of the first race in 1979, and the champion of the 1981 season. The father of Affonso Giaffone, a former IndyCar Series driver.
 Paulo Gomes (1979–2003/2007) – The winner of the first season in 1979, also 4-time champion.
 Chico Serra (1999–2009) – 3-time champion (1999, 2000 and 2001)
 Ingo Hoffmann (1979–2008) – 12-time champion (1980, 1985, 1989, 1990, 1991, 1992, 1993, 1994, 1996, 1997, 1998 and 2002) and the driver with the most series wins overall with 77. He competed from 1979 to 2008.
 Cacá Bueno (2002–) – 5-time Champion: (2006, 2007, 2009, 2011 and 2012). Runner-up: 2003, 2004 and 2005. He is the son of the sports commentator Galvão Bueno.
 Daniel Serra (2007–) – 3-time champion (2017, 2018 and 2019), 2-time 24 Hours of Le Mans GTE Pro class winner (2017 and 2019) and son of Chico Serra.

Former Formula One drivers
Currently in the series
 Ricardo Zonta (2007–)
 Rubens Barrichello (2012–)
 Nelson Piquet Jr. (2014–2015, 2018–)
Felipe Massa (2018, 2021–)

Formerly in the series
 Ingo Hoffmann (1979–2008)
 Raul Boesel (1979, 2003–2005)
 Chico Serra (1980s – 2007 / 2009 / 2014)
 Tarso Marques (2005–2011, 2018)
 Roberto Moreno (2005)
 Jacques Villeneuve (2011 / 2015)
 Alex Ribeiro (1980s)
 Wilson Fittipaldi (1980s – early 1990s)
 Christian Fittipaldi (2005–2007 / 2010)
 Luciano Burti (2005–2018)
Antônio Pizzonia (2007–2018)
 Enrique Bernoldi (2007 / 2009 / 2014–2015)
 Esteban Tuero (2005)
 Luiz Bueno (1982)
 Bruno Senna (2013–2014)
Lucas di Grassi (2014–2015, 2018–2019)
 Ricardo Rosset (2014–2015)
 Roberto Merhi (2014)
 Jaime Alguersuari (2015)
 Vitantonio Liuzzi (2015)
 Jérôme d'Ambrosio (2018)

Champions
All champions are Brazilian-registered.

Circuits
Races are held mostly on road courses, although a race was held on a street circuit in Salvador for the first time in 2009. The tracks for the 2023 season are:

  Autódromo Internacional Ayrton Senna (Goiânia), Goiânia, GO (1979–1981, 1983–2001, 2004, 2014–present)
  Autódromo José Carlos Pace (Interlagos), São Paulo, SP (1979–present)
  Autódromo Velo Città, Mogi Guaçu, SP (2017–present)
  Autódromo Internacional Nelson Piquet, Brasília, DF (1979–1981, 1983–1986, 1988–1992, 1994–2014)

Former circuits include:

  Autódromo Juan y Oscar Gálvez, Argentina (2005–2007, 2017)
  Autódromo Internacional Virgílio Távora, Fortaleza, CE (1979, 1984, 1989, 1992)
  Autódromo Internacional Ayrton Senna (Londrina), Londrina, PR (1993–1995, 1997, 1999–2008, 2010–2012, 2016–2020)
  Autódromo Internacional de Cascavel, Cascavel, PR (1979–1981, 1983–1993, 1995–1997, 2000, 2012–2021)
  Autódromo Internacional de Curitiba, Pinhais, PR (1980–2018, 2020–2021)
  Autódromo Internacional de Guaporé, Guaporé, RS (1979–1981, 1983–1995, 2000, 2002)
  Autódromo Internacional de Santa Cruz do Sul, Santa Cruz do Sul, RS (2005–2011, 2014–2019, 2021–present)
  Autódromo Internacional de Tarumã, Viamão, RS (1979–1981, 1983–1996, 1998–2001, 2004–2009, 2012–2017)
  Autódromo Internacional Nelson Piquet (Jacarepaguá), Rio de Janeiro, RJ (1979–2012)
  Autódromo Internacional Orlando Moura, Campo Grande, MS (2002–2004, 2006–2011, 2015, 2018–2019)
  Circuito Ayrton Senna, Salvador, BA (2009–2014)
  Circuito Cacá Bueno, Rio de Janeiro, RJ (2022)
  Circuito do Estoril, Portugal (1982)
  Circuito dos Cristais, Curvelo, MG (2016–2017)
  Ribeirão Preto Street Circuit, Ribeirão Preto, SP (2010–2013, 2015)
  Velopark, Nova Santa Rita, RS (2010–2019, 2022)

Fatal accidents
There have been five fatal accidents:

 In 1985, Zeca Greguricinski, died at Interlagos from burns suffered after a crash.
 In June 2001, Laércio Justino, died at Nelson Piquet Circuit of Brasília after losing control of the car and crashing at the pit lane entrance.
 In September 2003, Raphael Lima Pereira, a 19-year-old photographer, was hit by Gualter Salles at Campo Grande circuit and died. He was near the safety area at the time of the accident.
 On 9 December 2007, Rafael Sperafico, of the Sperafico racing family, died during the final race of the Stock Car Light 2007 season at Interlagos. His cousins Rodrigo and Ricardo Sperafico compete in the top-level series. It was the first fatal accident in the Stock Car Light series.
 On 3 April 2011, Gustavo Sondermann, competing in a Copa Chevrolet Montana race, was killed at Interlagos in an accident almost identical to that of Sperafico four years earlier.

Video games
The first official video game was Game Stock Car in 2011, with a followup title Stock Car Extreme launched in 2013. Both were developed by Reiza Studios.

Automobilista, released in 2016 and developed by Reiza Studios using the RFactor engine, featured the full 2015 and 2017 car grids and circuits. Automobilista 2, released in 2020 using the Project CARS engine, adding the 2019 and 2020 cars and circuits.

Racing simulator iRacing has included the Stock Car Pro Series cars in the game since 2022.

See also
Copa Truck
Deutsche Tourenwagen Masters
NASCAR
TC 2000 Championship
World Touring Car Cup
Brazilian Automobile Confederation
Stock Series

Notes

References

External links

 Official website of the Stock Car Brasil

 
Touring car racing series
1979 establishments in Brazil
Motorsport competitions in Brazil